Integral theory is a synthetic metatheory developed by Ken Wilber. It attempts to place a wide diversity of theories and models into one single framework. The basis is a "spectrum of consciousness," from archaic consciousness to ultimate spirit, presented as a developmental model. This model is based on development stages as described in structural developmental stage theories; various psychic and supernatural experiences; and models of spiritual development. In Wilber's later framework, the AQAL (All Quadrants All Levels) model, it is extended with a grid with four quadrants (interior-exterior, individual-collective), synthesizing various theories and models of individual psychological and spiritual development, of collective mutations of consciousness, and of levels or holons of neurological functioning and societal organisation, in a metatheory in which all academic disciplines and every form of knowledge and experience are supposed to fit together.

Wilber's integral theory has been applied in a number of domains. The Integral Institute currently publishes the peer-reviewed Journal of Integral Theory and Practice, and SUNY Press has published twelve books in the "SUNY series in Integral Theory." Nevertheless, Wilber's ideas have mainly attracted attention in specific subcultures, and have been mostly ignored in academia.

Origins and background

Origins
Ken Wilber's "Integral Theory" is a synthetic metatheory, a theory whose subject matter is theory itself, aiming to describe existing theory in a systematic way. A synthetic metatheory "classifies whole theories according to some overarching typology." Wilber's metatheory started in the early 1970s, with the publication of The Spectrum of Consciousness (1977), synthesizing eastern religious traditions with western developmental psychology. In The Atman Project (1980), this spectrum was presented as a developmental model,  akin to western structural stage theory, models of psychology development that describe human development as following a set course of stages of development.  

According to these early presentations, which rely strongly on perceived analogies between disparate theories (Sri Aurobindo's Integral Yoga, stage theories of psychological development, and Gebser's theory of collective mutations of consciousness), human development follows a set course, from pre-personal infant development, to personal adult development, culminating in trans-personal spiritual development. In Wilber's model, development starts with the separation of individual consciousness from a transcendental reality. The whole course of human development aims at restoring the primordial unity of human and transcendental consciousness. The pre-personal and personal stages are taken from western structural stage theories, which are correlated with other theories. The trans-personal stages consist of psychic and supernatural experiences (psychic and subtle stage), and of models of spiritual development from a variety of eastern religious traditions as interpreted by Wilber (subtle and causal stage). These are placed in a value hierarchy above the structural stages, akin to the Great Chain of Being and Aurobindo's elaboration of the five koshas, and presented as further structural stages.

Wilber's ideas have grown more and more inclusive over the years, incorporating ontology, epistemology, and methodology, creating that placeas a framework which he now calls AQAL, "All Quadrants All Levels." In this, Wilber's older frameworks are extended with a grid with four quadrants (interior-exterior, individual-collective), to comprehend individual development, collective mutations of consciousness, and levels or holons of neurological functioning and societal organisation, in a metatheory, in which all academic disciplines and every form of knowledge and experience are supposed to fit together.

Main influences

Sri Aurobindo

The integral yoga of Sri Aurobindo describes Aurobindo discerns five levels of being (physical; vital; mind or mental being; the higher reaches of mind or psychic being; Supermind), akin to the five koshas or sheats, and three types of being (outer being, inner being, psychic being). The psychic being refers to the higher reaches of mind (higher mind, illuminated mind, intuition, overmind). It correlates with buddhi, the connecting element between purusha and prakriti in Samkhya, and correlated by Wilber with his transpersonal stages. Aurobindo focuses on spiritual development and the process of unifying of all parts of one's being with the Divine. As described by Sri Aurobindo and his co-worker The Mother (1878–1973), this spiritual teaching involves an integral divine transformation of the entire being, rather than the liberation of only a single faculty such as the intellect or the emotions or the body.

Structural stage theory

Structural stage theories are based on the observation that humans develop through a pattern of distinct stages over time, and that these stages can be described based on their distinguishing characteristics. In Piaget's theory of cognitive development, and related models like those of Jane Loevinger and James W. Fowler, stages have a constant order of succession, later stages integrate the achievements of earlier stages, and each is characterized by a particular type of structure of mental processes which is specific to it. The time of appearance may vary to a certain extent depending upon environmental conditions.

Jean Gebser - Mutations of consciousness
The word integral was independently suggested by Jean Gebser (1905–1973), a Swiss phenomenologist and interdisciplinary scholar, in 1939 to describe his own intuition regarding the next structure of human consciousness. Gebser was the author of The Ever-Present Origin, which describes human history as a series of mutations in consciousness. He only afterwards discovered the similarity between his own ideas and those of Sri Aurobindo and Teilhard de Chardin. In his book The Ever-Present Origin, Gebser distinguished between five mutations of consciousness: archaic, magic, mythical, mental, and integral. Gebser wrote that he was unaware of Sri Aurobindo's prior usage of the term "integral", which coincides to some extent with his own. He collaborated with the German indologist Georg Feuerstein, who popularized his work.

Spiral Dynamics and collaboration with Don Beck

After completing Sex, Ecology, Spirituality (1995), Ken Wilber started to collaborate with Don Beck, whose Spiral Dynamics is based on the work of Clare W. Graves, and shows strong correlates with Wilber's model. The collaboration with Wilber led to a split between Beck and Cowan. After the collaboration with Christopher Cowan ended, Beck announced his own version of Spiral Dynamics, namely "Spiral Dynamics integral" (SDi) at the very end of 2001, while Cowan and his business partner Natasha Todorovic stayed closer to Graves'original model.

In his 2006 book Integral Spirituality, Wilber created the AQAL "altitudes," the first eight of which parallel Spiral Dynamics, as a more comprehensive, integrated system. By 2006, Wilber and Beck had diverged in their interpretations of the Spiral Dynamics model, with Beck positioning the spiral of levels at the center of the quadrants, while Wilber placed it solely in the lower left quadrant.  Beck saw Wilber's modifications as distortions of the model, and expressed frustration with what he saw as Wilber's exclusive focus on spirituality, while Wilber declared Spiral Dynamics to be incomplete as those who study only Spiral Dynamics "will never have a satori."  Beck continued to use the SDi name along with the 4Q/8L (four quadrants/eight levels) system from A Theory of Everything, while Wilber went on to criticize both Beck and Cowan.

Wilber's metatheory
In Sex, Ecology, Spirituality (1995) introduced his AQAL (All Quadrants All Levels) metatheory, a framework which consists of four fundamental concepts and a rest-category: four quadrants (interior-exterior, individual-collective), several levels and lines of development, several states of consciousness, and "types", topics which don't fit into these four concepts. According to Wilber, it is one of the most comprehensive approaches to reality, a metatheory in which all academic disciplines and every form of knowledge and experience fit together coherently.

"Levels" are the stages of development, from pre-personal through personal to transpersonal. "Lines" are lines of development, the several domains of development, which may process uneven, with several stages of development in place at the various domains. "States" are states of consciousness; according to Wilber persons may have a terminal experience of a higher developmental stage. "Types" is a rest-category, for phenomena which don't fit in the other four concepts. The individual building blocks of Wilber's model are holons, which means means that every entity and concept is both an entity on its own, and a hierarchical part of a larger whole. Holons form natural "holarchies", like Russian dolls, where a whole is a part of another whole, in turn part of another whole, and so on.

In order for an account of the Kosmos to be complete, Wilber believes that it must include each of these five categories. For Wilber, only such an account can be accurately called "integral," describing AQAL as "one suggested architecture of the Kosmos."

Four quadrants 

The AQAL-framework has a four-quadrant grid with two axes, namely "interior-exterior," akin to the subjective-objective distinction, and "individual-collective." The left side (interior) mirrors the individual development from structural stage theory, and the collective mutations of consciousness from Gebser. The right side describes levels of neurological functioning and societal organisation. Wilber uses this grid to categorize the perspectives of various theories and scholars:
 Interior individual perspective (upper-left quadrant) describes individual psychological development, as described in structural stage theory, focusing on "I";
 Interior plural perspective (lower-left) describes collective mutations in consciousness, as in Gebser's theory, focusing on "We";
 Exterior individual perspective (upper-right) describes the physical (neurological) correlates of consciousness, from atoms through the nerve-system to the neo-cortex, focusing on observable behaviour, "It";
 Exterior plural perspective (lower-right) describes the organisational levels of society (i.e. a plurality of people) as functional entities seen from outside, e.g. "They."

Each of the four approaches has a valid perspective to offer. The subjective emotional pain of a person who suffers a tragedy is one perspective; the social statistics about such tragedies are different perspectives on the same matter. According to Wilber all are needed for real appreciation of a matter. 

According to Wilber, all four perspectives offer complementary, rather than contradictory, perspectives. It is possible for all to be correct, and all are necessary for a complete account of human existence. According to Wilber, each by itself offers only a partial view of reality. According to Wilber modern western society has a pathological focus on the exterior or objective perspective. Such perspectives value that which can be externally measured and tested in a laboratory, but tend to deny or marginalize the left sides (subjectivity, individual experience, feelings, values) as unproven or having no meaning. Wilber identifies this as a fundamental cause of society's malaise, and names the situation resulting from such perspectives, "flatland".

The model is topped with formless awareness, "the simple feeling of being," which is equated with a range of "ultimates" from a variety of eastern traditions. This formless awareness transcends the phenomenal world, which is ultimately only an appearance of some transcendental reality. According to Wilber, the AQAL categories—quadrants, lines, levels, states, and types—describe the relative truth of the two truths doctrine of Buddhism.

Levels or stages

The basis of Wilber's theory is his developmental model. Wilber's model follows the discrete structural stages of development, as described in the structural stage theories of developmental psychology, most notably Loevinger's stages of ego development. To these stages are added psychic and supernatural experiences and various models of spiritual development, presented as additional and higher stages of structural development. According to Wilber, these stages can be grouped in pre-personal (subconscious motivations), personal (conscious mental processes), and transpersonal (integrative and mystical structures) stages.

All of these mental structures are considered to be complementary and legitimate, rather than mutual exclusive. Wilber's equates the levels in psychological and cultural development, with the hierarchical nature of matter itself.

Lines, streams, or intelligences
According to Wilber, various domains or lines of development, or intelligences can be discerned. They include cognitive, ethical, aesthetic, spiritual, kinesthetic, affective, musical, spatial, logical-mathematical, karmic, etc. For example, one can be highly developed cognitively (cerebrally smart) without being highly developed morally (as in the case of Nazi doctors).

States
States are temporary states of consciousness, such as waking, dreaming and sleeping, bodily sensations, and drug-induced and meditation-induced states. Some states are interpreted as temporary intimations of higher stages of development. Wilber's formulation is: "States are free but structures are earned." A person has to build or earn structure; it cannot be peak-experienced for free. What can be peak-experienced, however, are higher states of freedom from the stage a person is habituated to, so these deeper or higher states can be experienced at any level.

Types
These are models and theories that don't fit into Wilber’s other categorizations. Masculine/feminine, the nine Enneagram categories, and Jung's archetypes and typologies, among innumerable others, are all valid types in Wilber's schema. Wilber makes types part of his model in order to point out that these distinctions are different from the already mentioned distinctions: quadrants, lines, levels and states.

Holons

Holons are the individual building blocks of Wilber's model. Wilber borrowed the concept of holons from Arthur Koestler's description of the great chain of being, a mediaeval description of levels of being. "Holon" means that every entity and concept is both an entity on its own, and a hierarchical part of a larger whole. For example, a cell in an organism is both a whole as a cell, and at the same time a part of another whole, the organism. Likewise a letter is a self-existing entity and simultaneously an integral part of a word, which then is part of a sentence, which is part of a paragraph, which is part of a page; and so on. Everything from quarks to matter to energy to ideas can be looked at in this way. The relation between individuals and society is not the same as between cells and organisms though, because individual holons can be members but not parts of social holons.

In his book Sex, Ecology, Spirituality: The Spirit of Evolution, Wilber outlines twenty fundamental properties, called "tenets", that characterize all holons. For example, they must be able to maintain their "wholeness" and also their "part-ness;" a holon that cannot maintain its wholeness will cease to exist and will break up into its constituent parts.

Holons form natural "holarchies", like Russian dolls, where a whole is a part of another whole, in turn part of another whole, and so on. Each holon can be seen from within (subjective, interior perspective) and from the outside (objective, exterior perspective), and from an individual or a collective perspective.

Influence

Integral movement 
Some individuals affiliated with Ken Wilber have claimed that there exists a loosely defined "Integral movement". Others, however, have disagreed. Whatever its status as a "movement", there are a variety of religious organizations, think tanks, conferences, workshops, and publications in the US and internationally that use the term integral.

According to John Bothwell and David Geier, among the top thinkers in the integral movement are Stanislav Grof, Fred Kofman, George Leonard, Michael Murphy, Jenny Wade, Roger Walsh, Ken Wilber, and Michael E. Zimmerman. In 2007, Steve McIntosh pointed to Henri Bergson and Teilhard de Chardin as pre-figuring Wilber as integral thinkers. While in the same year, the editors of What Is Enlightenment? listed as contemporary Integralists Don Edward Beck, Allan Combs, Robert Godwin, Sally Goerner, George Leonard, Michael Murphy, William Irwin Thompson, and Wilber.

Gary Hampson suggested that there are six intertwined genealogical branches of Integral, based on those who first used the term: those aligned with Aurobindo, Gebser, Wilber, Gangadean, László and Steiner (noting that the Steiner branch is via the conduit of Gidley).

Applications 
Michael E. Zimmerman and Sean Esbjörn-Hargens have applied Wilber's integral theory in their environmental studies and ecological research, calling it "integral ecology". Elza Maalouf had used the AQAL-model in her corporate consulting worm in the Middle East. In his book MEMEnomics Said E. Dawlabani uses "Spiral Dynamics" to develop insights regarding the lead up and aftermath of the 2008 global financial crisis. "Integral leadership" is presented as a style of leadership that attempts to integrate major styles of leadership. Don Beck, Lawrence Chickering, Jack Crittenden, David Sprecher, and Ken Wilber have applied the AQAL-model to issues in political philosophy and applications in government, calling it "integral politics". Sen has called the Yoga psychology of Sri Aurobindo "Integral psychology." For Wilber, "integral psychology" is psychology that is inclusive or holistic rather than exclusivist or reductive, and values and integrates multiple explanations and methodologies. Marilyn Hamilton used the term "integral city", describing the city as a living human system, using an integral lens. Integral Life Practice (ILP) applies Ken Wilber's Integral model through nine modules of personal practice.  Examples of "integral practice" not associated with Ken Wilber, and derived from alternate approaches, are Integral Transformative Practice (ITP), Holistic Integration, and Integral Lifework.

Other approaches
Bonnitta Roy has introduced a "Process Model" of integral theory, combining Western process philosophy, Dzogchen ideas, and Wilberian theory. She distinguishes between Wilber's concept of perspective and the Dzogchen concept of view, arguing that Wilber's view is situated within a framework or structural enfoldment which constrains it, in contrast to the Dzogchen intention of being mindful of view.

Wendelin Küpers, a German scholar specializing in phenomenological research, has proposed that an "integral pheno-practice" based on aspects of the work of Maurice Merleau-Ponty can provide the basis of an "adequate phenomenology" useful in integral research. His proposed approach claims to offer a more inclusive and coherent approach than classical phenomenology, including procedures and techniques called epoché, bracketing, reduction, and free variation.

Sean Esbjörn-Hargens has proposed a new approach to climate change called Integral Pluralism, which builds on Wilber's recent work but emphasizes elements such as Ontological Pluralism that are understated or absent in Wilber's own writings.

Reception in mainstream academia 
Integral Theory is irrelevant, and widely ignored, at mainstream academic institutions, and has been sharply contested by critics. The independent scholar Frank Visser says that there is a problematic relation between Wilber and academia for several reasons, including a "self-referential discourse" wherein Wilber tends to describe his work as being at the forefront of science. Visser has compiled a bibliography of online criticism of Wilber's Integral Theory and produced an overview of their objections. Another Wilber critic, the independent scholar Andrew P. Smith, observes that most of Wilber's work has not been published by university presses, a fact that discourages some academics from taking his ideas seriously. Wilber's failure to respond to critics of Integral Theory is also said to contribute to the field's chilly reception in some quarters.

Forman and Esbjörn-Hargens have countered criticisms regarding the academic standing of integral studies in part by claiming that the divide between Integral Theory and academia is exaggerated by critics who themselves lack academic credentials or standing. They also said that participants at the first Integral Theory Conference in 2008 had largely mainstream academic credentials and pointed to existing programs in alternative universities like John F. Kennedy University or Fielding Graduate University as an indication of the field's emergence.

SUNY Press began publishing their "SUNY series in Integral Theory" in 2010; as of 2021 there were 12 books in the series.

See also 
 Metamodernism
 Multidisciplinary approach
 Post-postmodernism
 Scale (analytical tool)
 Systems science
 Transdisciplinarity
 Transmodernism
 Vedanta

Notes

References

Sources
Printed sources

 

 

 

 
 

 
 

Web-sources

External links 
 IntegralLife (former Integral Institute)
 Homepage of Ken Wilber, the founder of the Integral theory

 
Holism
Philosophical schools and traditions
Spiritual evolution
New Age
Stage theories